Chiltah was a Mughal period outer garment. It resembled a quilted coat. Chiltah was a royal garment. Jahangir, the fourth Mughal Emperor, wore a nadiri garment with a chiltah.

Etymology 
Chiltah is a corrupted word of ''Chihalta'' that was a multilayer coat worn by soldiers.

See also 

 Qaba

References 

Coats (clothing)
Mughal clothing